Zafra de Záncara is a municipality in Cuenca, Autonomous Community of Castile-La Mancha, Spain.

Population growth
The Zafra de Záncara population has been decreasing since the early twentieth century (2000 inhabitants approx.) to the present, suffering the same problem of depopulation of rural areas in Spain.

Services
Zafra de Záncara does not have many basic services. There are no schools nor permanent medical doctors. Currently there is a house, a bar and a shop in the town center, along with two restaurants and a shop next to the A3.

Settlers
The populace is primarily dedicated to agriculture. There are remnants of Iberian, Visigoth and Arab settlements, of which few traces remain. The Arab influences can be seen in the remains of walls and castles and in the layout of most streets.

Demography

Famous natives
 Fernando Casado de Torres e Irala (1754–1829): squadron leader and general commander of the Corps of Engineers of the Royal Spanish Navy.

References

External links

Municipalities in the Province of Cuenca